The Summit League, or The Summit, is an NCAA Division I intercollegiate athletic conference with its membership mostly located in the Midwestern United States from Illinois on the East of the Mississippi River to the Dakotas and Nebraska on the West, with additional members in the Western state of Colorado and the Southern state of Oklahoma. Founded as the Association of Mid-Continent Universities in 1982, it rebranded as the Mid-Continent Conference in 1989, then again as the Summit League on June 1, 2007. The league headquarters are in Sioux Falls, South Dakota.

The membership currently consists of 10 full members plus six associate members. The most recent change in the core conference membership is the 2021 arrival of the University of St. Thomas, which began an unprecedented transition from NCAA Division III to Division I. A year earlier, the University of Missouri–Kansas City returned as a full member after a seven-year absence with the new athletic identity of the Kansas City Roos, while Purdue University Fort Wayne left for the Horizon League. A total of 32 schools have been full members, but the only charter member remaining in the league today is Western Illinois University.

History

Early Days 
The conference can trace its roots back to 1978, when the Mid-Continent Athletic Association was founded as a football-only conference playing in Division II at the time.  Its inaugural members were the University of Akron, Eastern Illinois University, University of Northern Iowa, Northern Michigan University, Western Illinois University, and Youngstown State University; Wayne State University had also expressed interest in joining, but ultimately never did. Akron left after the 1979 season, while Northern Michigan and Youngstown State left the following year; they were replaced by Southwest Missouri State (now known as Missouri State University) in 1981. The 1981 season also saw the conference as a whole move from Division II to Division I-AA; this would be the conference's final season under the name of the Mid-Continent Athletic Association.

Foundation 
The new association was officially created on June 18, 1982, at the O'Hare Hilton Hotel in Chicago, Illinois as the Association of Mid-Continent Universities (or AMCU or AMCU-8, pronounced Am-cue), which it was known as until 1989. Covering all men's sports now in addition to football, the new conference consisted of current MCAA members Northern Iowa, Eastern Illinois, Western Illinois University and Southwest Missouri State, along with non-football sponsoring Cleveland State University, University of Illinois-Chicago, University of Wisconsin-Green Bay and Valparaiso University. The conference continued to sponsor football, now under the new AMCU name, from 1982 until 1984 at the Division I-AA level (now Division I FCS); and current members North Dakota, North Dakota State, South Dakota, South Dakota State, Western Illinois, and St. Thomas have FCS football programs.

Changes and the addition of women's sports 
The conference saw its first changes in the early 1990s. Southwest Missouri State departed for membership in the Missouri Valley Conference as the University of Akron and Northern Illinois University joined in 1990.  Then Wright State University joined in 1991 as Northern Iowa followed Southwest Missouri State to the MVC.

Major changes came to the conference in 1992. First, Akron left for the Mid-American Conference (MAC) and another Ohio school, Youngstown State University, replaced it. More significantly, the Mid-Continent added women's sports by absorbing the North Star Conference (NSC), a women's-only league whose final seven members were in the Mid-Continent. All of the final NSC members except for Akron moved their women's sports into the Mid-Continent. At the same time, Eastern Illinois and Western Illinois moved their women's sports into the Mid-Continent when their former women's sports home, the Gateway Conference, merged into the Missouri Valley Conference. The University of Wisconsin–Milwaukee joined the Mid-Continent a year later.

Horizon and ECC transitions 
In 1994, charter members Cleveland State, UIC, and Green Bay, as well as newer members Wisconsin–Milwaukee, Northern Illinois, and Wright State left the conference to join the Midwestern Collegiate Conference, now known as the Horizon League.

The Mid-Continent absorbed Central Connecticut State University, Chicago State University, the University at Buffalo, Troy State University (now Troy University), and Northeastern Illinois University from the collapsed East Coast Conference in response. None of these institutions remain in the league.

Missouri-Kansas City, formerly an independent, also joined the Mid-Continent Conference in 1994.

Declining membership 
Eastern Illinois moved to the Ohio Valley Conference in 1996, reducing membership to nine programs. Troy State departed for the Trans America Athletic Conference while Central Connecticut joined the Northeast Conference in 1997. Buffalo joined the MAC in 1998 while Northeastern Illinois ceased intercollegiate athletics at that time. Oral Roberts University and Southern Utah University replaced the former pair while Indiana University-Purdue University Indianapolis (IUPUI) and Oakland University moved into the latter duo's spots a year later.

Youngstown State switched to the Horizon League in 2001, and Centenary College replaced it in 2003. Chicago State University announced in the spring of 2006 that it would withdraw from the conference to compete as an independent starting in the 2006–07 school year. Charter member Valparaiso then moved to the Horizon in 2007.

Renewed expansion and contraction 
Conference expansion was discussed at length at the Mid-Continent Conference annual Presidents Council meeting in 2006, and Indiana University-Purdue University Fort Wayne (IPFW, now Purdue Fort Wayne), North Dakota State, and South Dakota State were approved for site visits. On August 30, 2006, IPFW accepted an invitation to join the Mid-Continent Conference as a full member starting July 1, 2007. Both North Dakota State and South Dakota State also accepted invitations to join the conference the next day.

The Summit League continued its renewed expansion push with the admission of the University of South Dakota. The Coyotes began conference play in the 2011–12 academic year and become eligible for all championships the following season. Centenary College subsequently announced that it would leave the Summit League following the 2010–2011 campaign.

The University of North Dakota had also been openly rumored to have been courted by the Summit League, but controversy over the Fighting Sioux nickname in all likelihood prevented UND's admission at that time. Expectations that UND would join the Summit League came to an end on November 1, 2010, when North Dakota instead accepted an invitation to join the Big Sky Conference. The University of South Dakota entered into very brief negotiations to join the Big Sky as well, rather than continuing their plans to join the Summit. However, South Dakota chose instead to remain with the more compact Summit League (along with other Dakota schools, NDSU and SDSU). As the University of Nebraska Omaha began the transition to Division I athletics in all sports, it joined the Summit League on July 1, 2012. With the departures of Centenary to Division III at the end of the 2010–11 athletic year, and Southern Utah and Oral Roberts for other Division I conferences at the end of the 2011–12 athletic year, the Summit League continued with nine institutions, all within the Midwest geographical region.

The conference unveiled the University of Denver (DU) as its 10th member on November 27, 2012, and the Pioneers joined in July 2013. While Denver is slightly outside The Summit's current Midwestern base, the city's status as a major air hub seemingly minimized travel issues for the other members. With Denver among the eight of ten WAC members switching to other conferences, that league searched for new members. UMKC announced on February 7, 2013, that it would be one of six schools joining the WAC for the 2013–14 season, dropping the Summit league back to nine member schools. Membership fell to eight schools on May 7, 2013, when Oakland announced that it was joining the Horizon League. Eight of the nine then-current Horizon League programs were former Summit League members with Oakland's move (the Horizon has since added two more members that were never in The Summit League, Northern Kentucky and Robert Morris, as well as another former Summit member in Purdue Fort Wayne).

In December 2013, The Summit League office announced that Oral Roberts University returned to the conference in all sports, effective July 1, 2014.

The next changes to the conference's core membership were announced in 2017. First, on January 26, North Dakota, which had resolved its controversy by selecting the new nickname Fighting Hawks, unveiled as a new member beginning in 2018. Then, on June 28, IUPUI announced it would leave the conference to join the Horizon League effective July 1, 2017.

For much of 2018, speculation involving further league expansion focused on Augustana University, a Division II school located in the Summit's headquarters city of Sioux Falls. Many of the school's boosters have ties to Sanford Health, a hospital company that has long been a major league sponsor and also owns the office complex that houses the league headquarters. The university announced on December 14 that it would start a transition to Division I, though stating at the time that no such move would take place until at least 2021. However, on May 22, 2020, the Summit League commissioner, Tom Douple, informed Augustana president Stephanie Herseth Sandlin that the conference would not be adding more new teams "at this time." The conference expanded anyway, announcing in June 2019 that UMKC would return in 2020 after a seven-year absence. However, shortly thereafter, Purdue Fort Wayne announced its 2020 departure for the Horizon League, maintaining the full-time conference membership at nine schools. Then, on October 4, 2019, the University of St. Thomas, a Minnesota school that was set to be expelled from its longtime athletic home of the NCAA Division III Minnesota Intercollegiate Athletic Conference (MIAC) in 2021, announced that it received an invitation to join the Summit upon its MIAC departure. St. Thomas eventually received a waiver of an NCAA rule mandating that Division III schools can only transition to Division II, allowing the school to move directly to D-I on the originally announced schedule.

Shortly before St. Thomas' future conference membership was confirmed, the University of Northern Colorado was announced as a baseball-only member effective in 2021–22. The most recent change to the affiliate membership was announced on May 11, 2022, when Lindenwood University and the University of Southern Indiana were announced as new affiliates in men's soccer plus men's and women's swimming & diving effective in 2022–23. Both institutions began transitions from Division II as new members of the Ohio Valley Conference, which does not sponsor any of these schools' Summit League sports, in July 2022. Southern Indiana is starting its swimming & diving program for both sexes in 2022–23.

Member schools

Current members

Current full members

Notes

Current associate members

Former members
All institutional names and nicknames used reflect those in the final school year of conference membership.

Former full members
The Summit League has 22 former members.

Notes

Former associate members

Notes

Membership timeline

   

 Purdue Fort Wayne joined the league as IPFW. The athletic branding was changed to "Fort Wayne" in 2016, and to Purdue Fort Wayne shortly before the dissolution of IPFW on July 1, 2018.
 Southwest Missouri State adopted its current name of Missouri State University in 2005.
 The two former members that are part of the University of Wisconsin System, namely UW–Green Bay and UW–Milwaukee, now brand themselves for athletic purposes as "Green Bay" and "Milwaukee".
 Troy State adopted its current name of Troy University in 2004.
 UMKC rebranded its athletic program as "Kansas City" in 2019, a year before its return to the league.

Sponsored sports
The Summit League sponsors championship competition in nine men's and ten women's NCAA sanctioned sports. Former full member Eastern Illinois is an associate member for men's and women's swimming and diving and men's soccer. Drake and Illinois State became associate members in men's tennis starting in 2017–18, and former full member Valparaiso rejoined for men's swimming and men's tennis at the same time. Valparaiso dropped men's tennis after the 2019–20 season; it remained a swimming associate until moving that sport to the Mid-American Conference in 2021. Northern Colorado became a baseball associate starting in the 2022 season (2021–22 school year), and Lindenwood and Southern Indiana became associates in men's soccer plus men's and women's swimming & diving in the 2022–23 school year.

Men's sponsored sports by school

Men's varsity sports not sponsored by The Summit League which are played by member schools:

Women's sponsored sports by school

Notes

Women's varsity sports not sponsored by The Summit League which are played by member schools:

Football

Men's basketball

Men's basketball in the NCAA tournament 

* At-large bid
** First Four game

Summit League championships won per school

Women's Basketball

Summit League championships won per school

Facilities

See also
 List of Summit League champions
 Summit League men's basketball tournament
 Summit League women's basketball tournament
 Summit League baseball tournament
 Association of Mid-Continent Universities football

References

External links

 

 
Organizations based in Sioux Falls, South Dakota
Sports in the Midwestern United States
Sports leagues established in 1982
1982 establishments in the United States
Articles which contain graphical timelines